Camp Bestival is a British music festival, the "little sister" of Bestival, both organised by BBC Radio 1 DJ Rob Da Bank. It is held annually, in July, at Lulworth Castle in Dorset and is targeted at families with small children. In 2019 it had a capacity of 10,000. It won the Best New Festival award from the UK Festival Awards in 2008 and Best Family Festival in 2009, 2010, 2013 and 2014.

In 2018 Camp Bestival went into administration, leaving many workers unpaid. However, a festival of the same name, curated by Rob da Bank and his wife Josie, took place in 2019, at the same site and on the equivalent weekend.

2008

The first Camp Bestival in 2008 included headliners Chuck Berry, Flaming Lips, Kate Nash, Billy Bragg, DJ Yoda, Kevin Rowland, Eliza Doolittle and Black Kids, but was troubled by the overcrowding of the campsites leading to many people camping by their cars in the nearby carparks.

The theme was 'Mad Hatter's Tea Party.

2009
The 2009 festival, held over the weekend 24–26 July, included musical performances by Florence and the Machine, PJ Harvey - in her only UK solo appearance of the year, Chic, Will Young, Tinchy Stryder, VV Brown, Kid Creole and the Coconuts, Mercury Rev, Goldie Lookin' Chain, Wild Beasts, Roots Manuva, Candi Staton, Bon Iver, Phoenix, Alessi's Ark, Alela Diane, Micachu and the Shapes, Golden Silvers, Seth Lakeman and Laura Marling. Comedians appearing included Frankie Boyle, Marcus Brigstocke, Lee Mack and Michael "Atters" Attree. Other events included a barn dance, a show by the English National Ballet, and Hugh Fearnley-Whittingstall's River Cottage tent.

Changes from the previous year included a late-night Silent Disco to avoid waking children, and the number of toilets were tripled.

The theme was Animal Magic.

2010
The line-up for Camp Bestival 2010 included Madness, Calvin Harris, Billy Bragg, The Human League, Lee "Scratch" Perry and The Cuban Brothers. The festival was held over the weekend of 30 July to 1 August.

The theme was Fairy Tales.

2011
The 2011 Festival has now been extended to allow campers to arrive from the Thursday lunchtime, after complaints about the long time needed to get on site caused some festival-goers to miss some of the Friday attractions in 2010.

Headliners for 2011 are confirmed as Blondie, Mark Ronson and the Business International and Primal Scream who will be performing the Screamadelica album in its entirety in celebration of its 20-year anniversary. Other performers include ABC, The Wonder Stuff, House of Pain, Eliza Doolittle, Bad Shepherds, Easy Star All-Stars and Ed Sheeran. 

Comedy performers include Marcus Brigstock, Milton Jones, Marcus Walsh and Jack Whitehall whilst there will be spoken word from Laura Dockrell, Simon Day and Sam Leith plus a continuation of the popular "How to..." series with speakers including Howard Marks. 

Family entertainment included Mr Tumble, live performances of The Gruffalo and Shrek: The Musical and "100 Free things for Kids".

The theme was Medieval.

2012
2012 Camp Bestival had an Olympic theme following the London 2012 Olympic games. The 2012 headliners included Kool and the Gang, Chic featuring Nile Rodgers, Hot Chip, The Happy Mondays, Rizzle Kicks, Stooshe and Rolf Harris. Other entertainment included Jimmy Carr, Mr Tumble and Russel Kane plus entertainment from The Gruffalo Live, and Shrek the Musical.

2013
The 2013 Festival was held over the first four days in August and themed 'around the world'. This year featured the addition of the dance space and science tent but the removal of the 'Little Big Top'.

Headliners included Richard Hawley, Levellers and Labrinth, Other performers included DJ Fresh, The Farm, Kid Creole and the Coconuts, Mark Owen and Gabrielle Aplin. This year also featured a world record attempt for the most paper aeroplanes flying at once in support of the new Disney/Pixar movie Planes.

Other performers included London Grammar, JAWS, The 1975 and Clean Bandit.

2014

Camp Bestival 2014 ran from 31 July to 3 August and had the theme of "Circus". The festivals 2014 headliners were Basement Jaxx, De La Soul and James.

Other acts and artists appearing across the weekend included Johnny Marr, Sinéad O'Connor, Pop Will Eat Itself, Laura Mvula, Steve Mason, The Skatalites, Peter Hook & The Light, The Cuban Brothers, MNEK, Wilkinson, Chas & Dave, Sophie Ellis-Bextor and Nick Mulvey.

2015

Camp Bestival 2015 ran from 30 July to 2 August. The headliners were Clean Bandit, Kaiser Chiefs and Underworld. The theme was Go Wild!

2016

Camp Bestival 2016 ran from 28 to 31 July. The headliners were Fatboy Slim, Tears for Fears and Jess Glynne. The theme was Space.

2020
In common with most UK festivals, the 2020 event was cancelled, due to the COVID-19 pandemic.

The event
Camp Bestival features a variety of activities and entertainment throughout the festival. Apart from a 4-days long multiple arena line-up, the festival offers comedy shows, literature programmes, kids areas, multiple workshops and performances.

Food and drink vendors are available all over the festival site.

References

External links

Official website
Camp Bestival site from the NME
Review and photo gallery by Clash Music

Music festivals in Dorset
Children's festivals in the United Kingdom
Electronic music festivals in the United Kingdom
Children's music festivals